The 2012 Judo Grand Slam Rio de Janeiro was held in Rio de Janeiro, Brazil, from 9 to 10 June 2012.

Medal summary

Men's events

Women's events

Source Results

Medal table

References

External links
 

2012 IJF World Tour
2012 Judo Grand Slam
Judo
Judo competitions in Brazil
Judo
Judo